Test Valley is a local government district and borough in Hampshire, England, named after the valley of the River Test. Its council is based in Andover.

The borough was formed on 1 April 1974 by a merger of the boroughs of Andover and Romsey, along with Andover Rural District and Romsey and Stockbridge Rural District.

Location
Test Valley is a predominantly rural area. It encompasses the North Wessex Downs Area of Outstanding Natural Beauty.

The River Test is the centrepiece of the Test Valley; the river is a chalk stream of particular beauty known for its fishing, salmon and trout, which Lord Crickhowell (onetime chairman of the National Rivers Authority) said "should be treated as a great work of art or music". Home of the Houghton Fishing Club, an exclusive fishing club founded in 1822, which meets in the Grosvenor Hotel in Stockbridge.

Demographics
In December 2006, Sport England published a survey which revealed that residents of Test Valley were the 8th most active in England in sports and other fitness activities. 26.9% of the population participate at least 3 times a week for 30 minutes.

In March 2012 Test Valley was ranked 14th best rural area to live out of 119 local authority areas in Great Britain by the Halifax. This was based on factors including employment and income levels, the weather, health and life expectancy, education, crime, broadband access and other things.

Local elections

The council is elected every 4 years, with the latest elections occurring in May 2019, coinciding with national local elections. 43 seats are available in 20 wards.

As of 2 May 2019, the council affiliation was as follows:

Wards
Test Valley is separated into 20 wards:

See also
Test Valley Arts Foundation is local charitable trust which exists to promote arts and local artists in the borough of Test Valley.

References

External links
Test Valley Borough website

 
Andover, Hampshire
Non-metropolitan districts of Hampshire
Boroughs in England